Paa is a 2009 Indian Hindi-language comedy-drama film directed by R. Balki, starring Amitabh Bachchan, Abhishek Bachchan, and Vidya Balan. The film is inspired by the 1996 Hollywood film Jack as per some reports and is based on the relationship of a boy with a rare genetic condition known as progeria and his parents. Amitabh Bachchan and Abhishek Bachchan, in real life, are father and son respectively, but in Paa, they played opposite roles. The film was released worldwide on 4 December 2009. Veteran composer Ilaiyaraaja scored the music. The film was critically acclaimed in India and fared well at the box office. Despite a warm reception from Indian film critics, the film received mixed reviews from overseas film critics, according to the websites Metacritic and Rotten Tomatoes. 
Amitabh Bachchan received his third National Film Award for Best Actor at the 57th National Film Awards for his performance and his fifth Filmfare Award for Best Actor and Vidya Balan got her first Filmfare Award for Best Actress.

Plot
Auro (Amitabh Bachchan) is an intelligent and witty 12-year-old boy with an extremely rare genetic disorder called progeria. Mentally he is twelve and very normal, but physically he looks five times older. In spite of his condition, Auro is a very happy boy. He lives with his mother Vidya (Vidya Balan), who is a Gynaecologist. Amol Arte (Abhishek Bachchan) is a young, flamboyant politician. He is out to prove to the world that "politics" is not a bad word. He is a man with a mission. Auro is Amol's son; however, Vidya conceals this from him. Amol meets Auro when he visits Auro's school as a chief guest. He comes on the occasion of a competition on the "visionary of India". Amol decides Auro as the winner, impressed by the white globe he made. But being seen with such a prominent politician Auro is found by the media. The next day the media tries to enter his school. Auro, annoyed at this, sends him an e-mail, which says "I hate you". Amol reads it and obtains a restraining order from the High Court stating that nobody can disturb him without permission. Auro, relieved, tells him of his desire to visit the president's house. But due to Amol's political issues, he fails to show up on the appointed day. Auro, however, loses confidence in him but later agrees to go to Delhi with him although he now knows that Amol is his father. Though Amol does not know that Auro is his son, he takes him to Delhi to see the president's house. Auro says that he still needs to forgive Amol for his first mistake (not accepting him), but he doesn't tell him what it is. When on his 13th birthday he is in hospital he tells his father that he, Auro, is his father's mistake. Auro tries to get his mother and father back together, but Vidya resists, still hurt by the fact that Amol wanted her to have an abortion when they first found out she was pregnant. Amol realizes his mistake though, and proposes to Vidya, as he is still in love with her. He stays by Auro's side when he finds out that Auro is his son. Auro's health begins to deteriorate as he reaches his 13th birthday, his physical defects catching up. However, he is finally able to reunite his mother and father once again as Vidya gives in to her feelings for Amol and her motherly love for Auro. They perform the first wedding rites in the hospital in front of their dying son, implying that they will do the rest later. Auro, succumbing to his disease, says his last words "Maa" to Vidya and "Paa" to Amol before dying with a satisfied smile. The movie ends in the rain with Vidya mourning Auro's death as Amol comforts her as she remembers Auro dancing.

Cast
 Amitabh Bachchan as Auro Arte
 Vidya Balan as Dr. Vidya Bharadwaj, Auro's mother
 Abhishek Bachchan as Amol Arte, Auro's father
 Paresh Rawal as Kaushal Arte, Auro's paternal grandfather
 Arundhati Nag as Bhumi Bharadwaj, Auro's maternal grandmother
 Satyajit Sharma as Jaikirt
 Sachin Parikh as Vidya's patient
 Prateek Katare as Vishnu
 Taruni Sachdev as Soumini "Somi", Auro's classmate
 Olivier Lafont as Sagar
 Aalekh Kapoor as Raj

Production

Casting
The film had Amitabh Bachchan playing the role of a child who is suffering from Progeria, a genetic disorder which leads to quick acceleration of ageing process in children. Abhishek Bachchan, Amitabh's real-life son, played the role of his father.

Vidya Balan was the only choice for the mother's role. Arundathi Nag, the wife of late Kannada actor-director Shankar Nag was asked to play the role of Vidya's mother (Bachchan's maternal grandmother).

Filming
Most of the parts were shot in Lucknow and some parts of the film were shot in UK and Malaysia. A small portion of the filming was done at Cambridge. The clock of Corpus Christi College and courtyard of St. John's College have been shown in a song sequence. The film was also shot in Taiping, Malaysia. The King Edward VII school was actually one of the typical Malaysian schools.

One of the notable things in the movie was Amitabh's prosthetic make up. It was done by Hollywood's Christien Tinsley (famous for his work in The Passion of the Christ, Catwoman and other films) and Dominie Till of The Lord of the Rings film trilogy fame.

There was a plan to make a sequel named Maa, but Balki stopped it. In the words of Balki, "My main aim was not to make a film on progeria. My main motive behind making Paa was to reverse the roles of Amitabh and Abhishek. I decided to do something like this because once I was with both of them and I saw Abhishek behaving in a very matured manner and Amitabh, behaving as a kid. It was then that this idea struck me."

Paa was Abhishek Bachchan's first venture into producing films for his family company AB Corp. Ltd. Abhishek not only was one of the lead actors in Paa, but was the main hands-on producer in charge of the film's budget, marketing, and the entire production of the film. It took hours for Amitabh Bachchan to put on his makeup and to take it off.

Soundtrack

The soundtrack (songs and the background score) was scored by veteran composer Ilaiyaraaja.The lyrics were penned by Swanand Kirkire. "Halke Se Bole" is based on the Tamil song "Putham Pudhu Kaalai" from his 1980 film Alaigal Oivathillai. "Gumm Summ Gumm" is based on the Malayalam song "Thumbi Vaa" which Ilaiyaraaja had composed for the 1982 Malayalam film Olangal. The song "Mere Paa" is based on his Tamil song "Kaatru Vizhi", from Balu Mahendra's film Adhu Oru Kana Kaalam. The song has an eclectic mix of Irish and Tamil Folk music, both seamlessly fused to create a soothing melody that appears as a leitmotif, in the film's theme music.

Awards and nominations

 Won – Matri Shree Media Award for Best Film: 2010 – R. Balki

References

External links
 Official website
 

2000s Hindi-language films
2009 films
Films featuring a Best Actor National Award-winning performance
Films featuring a Best Supporting Actress National Film Award-winning performance
Films scored by Ilaiyaraaja
Films shot in Lucknow
Films set in Lucknow
Films directed by R. Balki
Indian drama films
Films that won the National Film Award for Best Make-up
Best Hindi Feature Film National Film Award winners
2009 drama films
Hindi-language drama films